.one may refer to:
 a file extension used by Microsoft OneNote
 .one (domain), a top-level domain